Malvaviscus arboreus is a species of flowering plant in the hibiscus family, Malvaceae, that is native to the American South, Mexico, Central America, and South America. The specific name, arboreus, refers to the tree-like appearance of a mature plant. It is now popular in cultivation and goes by many English names including wax mallow,  Turk's cap (mallow), Turk's turban, sleeping hibiscus, manzanilla, manzanita (de pollo), ladies teardrop and Scotchman's purse; many of these common names refer to other, in some cases unrelated, plants. Its flowers do not open fully and help attract butterflies and hummingbirds.

Distribution 
Malvaviscus arboreus is native to Central America, Mexico, and the Gulf Coast of the United States, particularly as an understory shrub in coastal Texas and Louisiana.

Habitat and ecology

Malvaviscus arboreus is a common understory shrub where it occurs in Texas and is an important food source for female and juvenile Ruby-throated Hummingbirds (Archilochus colubri) and Black-chinned Hummingbirds (A. alexandri). Each individual flower lasts two days but contains more nectar on the first day.

An example occurrence of M. arboreus is within the coastal Petenes mangroves of the Yucatán region of Mexico, in which plant community it is a subdominant species. M. arboreus is the primary host plant for the caterpillars of the Turk's-cap White-Skipper (Heliopetes macaira).

Cultivation 
Malvaviscus arboreus is commonly cultivated in shady to sunny sites in butterfly and hummingbird gardens across the southern United States.  It can be propagated from fresh seeds or from softwood cuttings.  It often blooms from May through November, but will bloom throughout a mild winter.

Varieties
 Malvaviscus arboreus var. arboreus
 Malvaviscus arboreus var. drummondii (Torr. & A.Gray) Schery (= Malvaviscus drummondii Torr. & A.Gray)
 Malvaviscus arboreus var. mexicanus Schltdl.

References

arboreus
Plants described in 1787
Flora of Central America
Flora of Mexico
Flora of South America
Flora of Texas
Flora of the Southeastern United States
Butterfly food plants
Flora without expected TNC conservation status
Taxa named by Antonio José Cavanilles